The National Bloc is a political party in Egypt created by former members of the Constitution Party.

References 

2013 establishments in Egypt
Political parties established in 2013